High is a surname. Notable people with the surname include:

S. Dale High, American chief executive
Ed High (1873–1926), American professional baseball player
Frank C. High (1875–1966), U.S. Army soldier who received the Medal of Honor
Jake High, American football player and coach
Jason High (born 1981), American mixed martial artist
Johnnie High (1929–2010), American impresario
Johnny High (1957–1987), American professional basketball player
Joseph Madison High (1855–1906), American businessman
Kathy High (born 1954), American interdisciplinary artist, curator and scholar
Martha High (born 1945), American singer
Monique Raphel High (born 1949), Franco-American author
Philip E. High (1914–2006), English science fiction author
Robert King High (1924–1967), American attorney and politician
Steve High, American women's basketball coach